Pellescritta is a frazione of Montereale, in the Province of L'Aquila in the Abruzzo region of Italy.

Frazioni of Montereale